Wizz Air UK Ltd. is a British low-cost airline and subsidiary of Hungarian airline, Wizz Air, using its corporate identity. Founded to enable Wizz Air to retain full UK market access post-Brexit, it operates two UK bases, with its headquarters London's Luton Airport. Wizz Air, including its UK subsidiary, operate flights from eight UK airports to almost 90 destinations across Europe and the Middle East.

Wizz Air UK holds a United Kingdom Civil Aviation Authority (CAA) Type A Operating Licence permitting it to carry passengers, cargo and mail on aircraft with 20 or more seats.

History
In October 2017, Wizz Air announced it had applied for an air operator's certificate (AOC) in the United Kingdom through a new UK-based subsidiary, Wizz Air UK, with plans for the subsidiary to take over a number of Wizz Air's existing routes from its existing Luton Airport base starting in March 2018. The following month, the airline announced an expansion of service at Luton after acquiring departure and landing slots from defunct Monarch Airlines. Wizz Air UK received its AOC in May 2018, two months later than originally planned. Wizz opened a further London base at Gatwick Airport in October 2020, basing an aircraft with four new routes

Wizz Air UK opened its second base at Doncaster Sheffield Airport in August 2020, basing one aircraft there and operating 10 routes. This was increased to 23 routes and another based aircraft in September 2020. However, in June 2022 Wizz Air UK announced it's Doncaster Sheffield base would be closing, citing the airport's inability to guarantee the terms of its commercial agreement with Wizz. In October 2022, Wizz Air ceased operating from Doncaster Sheffield and launched seven routes from nearby Leeds Bradford Airport, mainly to Eastern Europe.

In December 2020, Wizz Air UK announced it would be opening its fourth UK base at Cardiff Airport, basing one aircraft and opening 9 routes. In January 2023, Wizz Air announced the indefinite closure of its Cardiff base despite operating for less than a year. The airline cited  economic pressures such as rising fuel prices as the reason for the closure. The last Wizz Air flights from Cardiff will be on the 25th January 2023.

Wizz Air UK was the worst performer in 2021 for flight delays from UK airports, according to a study of Civil Aviation Authority data by PA Media, released in August 2022.

Destinations

Wizz Air UK operates in conjunction with parent company Wizz Air. Together, they operate to almost 90 destinations from the UK.

Fleet
There has been speculation that the subsidiary could operate up to 50 aircraft out of its UK bases by the end of the decade. , the Wizz Air UK fleet consists of the following aircraft:

References

External links

Airlines of the United Kingdom
Airlines established in 2017
Low-cost carriers
British companies established in 2017
British subsidiaries of foreign companies
2017 establishments in England
Companies based in Luton